Romeo und Julia is a 1943 opera by Boris Blacher.

Recording
In German: Hilde Güden, Richard Holm, Hermann Uhde, Sieglinde Wagner, Wiener Philharmoniker, Josef Krips 1950.
In English: M. Tolaydo, N. Simpson, K. Wilson, L. Crawford, D. Robinson, I. Peterson, L. Vote, Chesapeake Chamber Orch., cond. Jeffrey Silberschlag 2008

References

Operas
Romeo and Juliet
Operas by Boris Blacher